SS Saarland was a 6,870 ton German passenger ship, which was sold to Japan in 1940, renamed Teiyo Maru and used as troop transport ship by the Imperial Japanese Army (IJA) during World War II. It sank during the Battle of the Bismarck Sea with great loss of life.

Saarland was built by Blohm + Voss in Hamburg and launched in 1924. It sailed for the Hamburg America Line until 1940, when it was sold to the Japanese Imperial Steamship Co. (Teikoku Senpaku Kaisha) and renamed Teiyo Maru. One year later it was requisitioned by the Imperial Japanese Army and used as a troopship.

In March 1943, she left Rabaul, New Britain, as part of Operation 81, carrying 1,988 troops of the IJA’s 51st Division, including the 18th Army Headquarters and 1,500 cubic meters of war supplies. The convoy was attacked by aircraft of the United States Army Air Forces and Royal Australian Air Force from 2 March 1943, known as the Battle of the Bismarck Sea. On 3 March Teiyo Maru sustains 11 near misses, four direct bomb hits and two torpedoes.
1,882 troops, 15 shipboard gunners, 17 crewmen and Captain Ishisaka Takezo are killed.

Notes

References

In Titanic's Shadow: The World's Worst Merchant Ship Disasters by David L Williams

1923 ships
Ships built in Hamburg
Maritime incidents in March 1943
Ships sunk by US aircraft
Shipwrecks in the Bismarck Sea
World War II shipwrecks in the Pacific Ocean
Troop ships of Japan